Theodore Adams Mondale (born October 12, 1957) is an American politician who served as a member of the Minnesota Senate from 1991 to 1997. He is the elder son of the late former U.S. Vice President Walter Mondale and the late Joan Mondale.

Career
From 1991 to 1997, Mondale was a member of the Minnesota Senate. Mondale sought the Democratic primary nomination for Minnesota governor in 1998. He placed fifth in the Democratic primary.

In 1999, Mondale was appointed chairman of the Metropolitan Council in the cabinet of Governor Jesse Ventura. He oversaw the initiation of high density housing/retail development in the Twin Cities, as well as light-rail transportation planning from the suburban areas to the central cities. In 2011, he was named chair of the Metropolitan Sports Facilities Commission by Governor Mark Dayton. In 2012, Mondale was named the CEO of the Minnesota Sports Facilities Authority.

Personal life
Mondale was married to Pam Burris, with whom he has three children; the couple separated in 2011 and divorced in 2013. Mondale's sister, Eleanor Mondale, was a television personality who died of brain cancer at the age of 51 in 2011.

References

External links

1957 births
Living people
Children of vice presidents of the United States
Politicians from Minneapolis
Lawyers from Minneapolis
Democratic Party Minnesota state senators
University of Minnesota alumni
State cabinet secretaries of Minnesota
William Mitchell College of Law alumni
Walter Mondale
20th-century American politicians
21st-century American politicians